Anthony or Tony Romano may refer to:

 Tony Romano (musician) (1915–2005), American actor, performer and guitarist
 Tony Romano (ice hockey) (born 1988), American ice hockey player
 Anthony Romano, character in the film Sinner

See also
 Antonio Romano (disambiguation)
 Romano (disambiguation)